Winiger is a surname. Notable people with the surname include:

Josef Winiger (1855–1929), Swiss politician 
Melanie Winiger (born 1979), Swiss actress, model, and beauty pageant titleholder 
Samim Winiger, Swiss producer of electronic dance music

See also
Winger (surname)